Coastal Alabama Community College (also known as Coastal Alabama Community College – South) is a public community college with nine campuses in southern Alabama: Bay Minette, Fairhope, Gulf Shores, Atmore, Brewton, Gilbertown, Jackson, Monroeville, and Thomasville.  It is a member of the Alabama Community College System. Coastal Alabama was formed through the consolidation of Alabama Southern Community College, Faulkner State Community College, and Jefferson Davis Community College.

History

Jefferson Davis Community College
The college was founded in 1964 as Jefferson Davis Community College, named in honor of Jefferson Davis, president of the Confederate States of America.

Consolidation
On December 6, 2016 the Southern Association of Colleges and Schools voted to approve the consolidation of three institutions: Jefferson Davis Community College, Alabama Southern Community College, and Faulkner State Community College. All of which would now collectively be referred to as Coastal Alabama Community College. This merger took effect officially on January 11, 2017.

Brewton

The Coastal Alabama Community College Brewton (also known as Coastal Alabama Community College – East) has campuses in Brewton, Alabama. The Woodfin Patterson Auditorium hosts cultural events. There is also a new One-Stop Student Services Center, a recreational and experiential learning park, and a three- hole practice golf course.

The college athletics teams are nicknamed the Warhawks.

Monroeville

Coastal Alabama Community College Monroeville, (also known as Coastal Alabama Community College – North) formerly Alabama Southern Community College, is a community college system. Alabama Southern was formed in 1991 by the merger of Patrick Henry Junior College in Monroeville, Alabama and Hobson State Technical College in Thomasville, Alabama.  The Thomasville campus is home to the Kathryn Tucker Windham Museum.  In addition to two full service campuses located in these cities, learning centers are located in Gilbertown and Jackson, Alabama.

Accreditation 
The College is accredited by the Commission on Colleges of the Southern Association of Colleges and Schools to award three different types of Associate degrees: Associate of Arts (AA), Associate in Science (AS), and Associate in Applied Science Degrees (AAS).

Additional accreditations include those of:
 American Dental Association
 Commission on Dental Accreditation
 American Culinary Federation Educational Institute
 Commission on Accreditation of Allied Health Education Programs - Surgical Technologist
 Commission on Accreditation of Hospitality Management

Undergraduate majors

Alabama Southern offers undergraduate majors in Business Management and Marketing, Computer and Information Sciences, Construction Trades, Engineering, Engineering Technologies, Health Professions and Clinical Sciences, Liberal Arts and Sciences, Mechanic and Repair Technologies, Personal and Culinary Services, and in Security & Protective Services.

Athletics 
The College offers athletics programs in the following fields: Basketball, Baseball, Softball, Volleyball, Golf, Tennis, and Cheerleading.
In 2010 longtime Head Coach Wayne Larker led the baseball team to its first-ever appearance in the NJCAA World Series in Grand Junction, Colorado.

Notable people 

John Bale is a baseball pitcher who has played for the Toronto Blue Jays among others.

References

External links 
 Official website

Community colleges in Alabama
Education in Baldwin County, Alabama
Universities and colleges accredited by the Southern Association of Colleges and Schools
Fairhope, Alabama
Educational institutions established in 1965
Buildings and structures in Baldwin County, Alabama
1965 establishments in Alabama
NJCAA athletics